The Lighthouse by the Sea is a 1911 American silent film from a screenplay by Bannister Merwin.

Cast
Charles Sutton A Lighthouse Keeper
Mabel Trunnelle The Lighthouse Keeper's First Daughter
Laura Sawyer The Lighthouse Keeper's Second Daughter
Richard Neill The Lighthouse Keeper's Son
James Gordon First Young Fisherman
Herbert Prior Second Young Fisherman

References

External links

1911 films
1911 drama films
1911 short films
Silent American drama films
American silent short films
American black-and-white films
1910s American films